Vitale Ta'aga Magauli "Vic" So'oto (born August 19, 1987) is a former American football linebacker who is currently an outside linebackers coach for the California Golden Bears. He was signed as an undrafted free agent by the Green Bay Packers in 2011. He played college football at Brigham Young University (BYU).

He was also a member of the Oakland Raiders, Arizona Cardinals, New Orleans Saints, Washington Redskins, and Pittsburgh Steelers.

Early years
So'oto attended Carlsbad High School and won three varsity letters in football and also lettered in volleyball. In football, as a senior, he was named First-team All-CIF honors and team MVP.

College career
As a linebacker for BYU, So'oto finished the 2010 season with 45 tackles, (18 solo), and 5 quarterback sacks. As a senior, he was a First-team All-Mountain West Conference selection. During his career at BYU, So'oto also played at the tight end and defensive end positions. He missed the majority of the 2006 and 2008 seasons with injuries.

Playing career

Green Bay Packers
On July 26, 2011, the Green Bay Packers announced they had signed So'oto as an undrafted free agent. During the pre-season, So'oto suffered a back injury and was inactive for most of the regular season but made his professional debut on special teams against the Denver Broncos in week 4. So'oto was released by the Packers on September 10, 2012.

Oakland Raiders
On September 25, 2012, the Oakland Raiders announced they had signed So'oto. He played a total of four games for the Raiders during the 2012 season before being waived by the Raiders on November 6.

Return to the Packers
The Packers re-signed So'oto to their 53-man roster on November 12, 2012. On December 11, the Packers released him and signed So'oto to their practice squad after clearing waivers two days later.

Washington Redskins
On December 19, the Washington Redskins signed So'oto from the Green Bay Packers' practice squad.

The Redskins waived him on August 31, 2013 for final roster cuts before the start of 2013 season.

Arizona Cardinals
He was signed by the Arizona Cardinals on September 24, 2013 but released after just one game with a chest injury.

Pittsburgh Steelers
So'oto signed with the Pittsburgh Steelers during the 2014 offseason, but was released on August 25, 2014.

Coaching career
Beginning in 2016 So'oto served as a defensive graduate assistant at the University of Virginia under his college coach Bronco Mendenhall. On June 21, 2017 So'oto was added a full-time member of the coaching staff after Ruffin McNeill left for the University of Oklahoma.

In 2022 he became a part of the Colorado Buffaloes staff, however he left to coach for California before ever coaching a game.

References

External links
Green Bay Packers bio
BYU Cougars bio
Twitter

1987 births
Living people
American sportspeople of Samoan descent
Sportspeople from Carlsbad, California
Players of American football from California
American football defensive ends
American football linebackers
BYU Cougars football players
Oakland Raiders players
Washington Redskins players
Arizona Cardinals players
Pittsburgh Steelers players
Virginia Cavaliers football coaches
Green Bay Packers players
Sportspeople from Oceanside, California